Terminalia phillyreifolia is an Asian species of tree in the family Combretaceae. It is a medium-sized tree found in both primary and secondary tropical and sub-tropical forests. It is recorded from India to China, south to Thailand and Vietnam. It may be one of the dominant species of deciduous forests of Vietnam.

Besides timber uses, the bark of this species has a high tannin content.

Taxonomy
Formerly known as Anogeissus acuminata, a 2017 article embedded genera including Anogeissus into Terminalia. Several varieties were accepted in the 2017 Catalogue of Life checklist; no varieties are listed in Kew's Plants of the World Online .

Description
The branchlets are slightly pendent, slender, together with petioles and leaf blades golden villous when young. The petioles are cylindrical, 2–6 mm and the leaf blades are lanceolate to narrowly so, 40-80 × 10–30 mm long, grey-green on the back and pilose mostly in the axils of lateral veins. They are green and glabrous to glabrescent on the leaf surface. The leaf base is narrowed or obtuse, the apex acuminate. There are five to seven inconspicuous lateral veins in pairs.

The flowers are numerous sessile on flower heads 9–13 mm in diameter; bracts are easily deciduous and linear, 4–5 mm long. The calyx tubes are approximately 5 mm long, abaxially yellow pubescent, densely so on ovary and tubular part, and more sparsely so on the cup-shaped part. The filaments are 3–4 mm long. The fruits are approximately 6 × 5 mm long including a "beak". They are ferruginous pubescent distally and on the beak.

Terminalia phillyreifolia flowers between February and March in Bangladesh and Thailand.

References

phillyreifolia
Flora of Asia